Société nationale des pétroles du Congo (the National Petroleum Company of the Congo, SNPC) is a national oil company of the Republic of the Congo.  The company was established in 1998 after the dissolution of the public company Hydro-Congo.  The company manages government-owned shares of production from oil fields in the country.  The company has stakes in Moho-Bilondo (15%), Nkossa (15%), M'Boundi (8.8%), Kitina (35%), Sendji (15%), Yanga (15%), Djambala (35%), Foukanda (35%), Mwafi (35%), Emeraude (49%), Yombo (44%), Tilapia (35%), Azurite (15%), and Turquoise Marine-1 (15%) fields.  It owns the refinery company named Congolaise de Raffinage (CORAF).

References

Oil and gas companies of the Republic of the Congo
Companies established in 1998
1998 establishments in the Republic of the Congo